Como railway station is located on the Illawarra line, serving the Sydney suburb of Como. It is served by Sydney Trains T4 line services.

History

The first Como station opened on 26 December 1885 immediately south of the Georges River. When the original iron lattice girder bridge was replaced, a new station was built about one kilometre to the south opening on 27 November 1972.

The original station platform is still visible today near the southern end of the bridge. The station buildings have been demolished and a power sub-station was built in their place on the platform, most of which remains intact. There is no public access to the original platform but the subway tunnel under the rail line remains open.

On 22 November 2021 an upgrade to the station including two new lifts and a solar-glass canopy was opened to the public.

Platforms & services

References

The Book of Sydney Suburbs, Compiled by Frances Pollen, Angus & Robertson Publishers, 1990, Published in Australia

External links

Como station details Transport for New South Wales

Railway stations in Sydney
Railway stations in Australia opened in 1885
Railway stations in Australia opened in 1972
Illawarra railway line
Sutherland Shire